Z partyjnym pozdrowieniem. 12 hitów w stylu lambada hardcore, also simply known as Z partyjnym pozdrowieniem, was a 1990 Polish-language punk rock music album by band Big Cyc. It was published by Polskie Nagrania Muza record label, with the music recorded in Izabelin Studio. It was the first album of the band.

History 
The band Big Cyc was formed in 1988, and consisted of Jacek Jędrzejak, Jarosław Lis, Roman Lechowicz, and Robert Rajewski. Later, to the band also joined Krzysztof Skiba. The notable songs then recorded by the band, which would later be included in the album, included "Kapitan Żbik", and "Wielka miłość do babci klozetowej". The band debuted in March 1990 at the happening concert in club Balbina in Łódź, titled Uroczysta akademia z okazji 75-lecia wynalezienia damskiego biustonosza. Later that year, the band performed in West Berlin during the Schwarze Tage festivel.

In 1990, the band recorded new songs, in the Izabelin Studio. Notably, it included, "Berlin Zachodni" which became music hit. The songs "Kapitan Żbik" and "Berlin Zachodni", were placed, respectively, first, and forth, on the Lista Przebojów Programu Trzeciego music chart of the Polskie Radio Program III. The band originally considered publishing their album with Izabelin Studio, however, they published it with Polskie Nagrania Muza instead. It is estimated, that the album had sold over 200 000 copies, and had over 800 000 pirated copies made. The album became hit and was critically acclaimed.

In 1991, the plebiscite of the magazine Teraz Rock awarded Big Cyc with the title of the best band of the year, the best song of the year for "Berlin Zachodni", and the best album cover for the Z partyjnym pozdrowieniem. Krzysztof Skiba from the band was awarded the title of the best songwriter of the year.

Track listing

A-side 
 "Berlin Zachodni" (West Berlin) (3:51)
"Durna piosenka" (Stupid song) (3:34)
"Niedziela" (Sunday), a parody cover of "Niedziela będzie dla nas" (Sunday will be for us) by Niebiesko-Czarni (2:30)
"Aktywiści" (Activists) (4:04)
"Wielka miłość do babci klozetowej" (Great love to the toilet granny) (3:54)
"Kapitan Żbik" (Captain Żbik) (2:45)

B-side 
"Piosenka góralska" (Highland song), a parody cover of "Z kopyta kulig rwie" (With a hoof the sleigh rides) by Skaldowie (2:09)
"Dzieci Frankensteina" (Frankenstein's children) (3:26)
"Kontestacja" (Contestation) (3:49)
"Orgazm" (Orgasm) (2:23)
"Sąsiedzi" (Neighbours) (3:10)
"Ballada o smutnym skinie" (Ballad of a sad skinhead) (5:52)

Album cover 
The album cover was designed by Piotr Łopatka. It featured the portrait of Vladimir Lenin with punk Mohawk hairstyle. Originally, the record label opposed publishing such cover, in regard to uncertainty in the government transition, from socialism to capitalism. Eventually, the label agreed for the cover. In 1991, the plebiscite of the magazine Teraz Rock awarded it with the title of the best album cover of the year.

Personnel 
 main vocals: Jacek Jędrzejak, Jarosław Lis
 support vocals: Krzysztof Skiba, Roman Lechowicz
 bass guitar: Jacek Jędrzejak
 drums: Jarosław Lis
 music production: Jan Lizikowski
 sound production: Andrzej Puczyński
 cover design: Piotr Łopatka
 music video cinematography: Paweł Zimnicki

Notes

References 

1990 debut albums
Big Cyc albums
Anti-communist works